The Spanish Jade is a 1915 American drama silent film directed by Wilfred Lucas, written by Maurice Hewlett and Louis Joseph Vance, and starring Betty Bellairs, Wilfred Lucas, Nigel De Brulier, Arthur Tavares, Frank Lanning and Howard Davies. It was released on April 11, 1915, by Paramount Pictures. It was the first film produced by Fiction Pictures, Inc., a short-lived production company founded by Vance.

Plot

Cast  
Betty Bellairs as Manuela
Wilfred Lucas as Osmund Manvers
Nigel De Brulier as Don Luis 
Arthur Tavares as Don Bartolome
Frank Lanning as Tormillo
Howard Davies as Gil Perez
Lloyd Ingraham as Sebastian

See also
 The Spanish Jade (1922)

References

External links 
 
 
 The Spanish Jade at Silent Era

1915 films
1910s English-language films
Silent American drama films
1915 drama films
Paramount Pictures films
Films directed by Wilfred Lucas
American black-and-white films
American silent feature films
Films set in Spain
Films set in the 19th century
1910s American films